Andrew Micklefield is a Canadian provincial politician, who was elected as the Member of the Legislative Assembly of Manitoba for the riding of Rossmere in the 2016 election. He is a member of the Progressive Conservative party, and defeated NDP incumbent Erna Braun in the election. On August 24, 2016, Micklefield was appointed as the Government House Leader by Premier Brian Pallister.

He was re-elected in the 2019 provincial election.

References 

Living people
Politicians from Winnipeg
Progressive Conservative Party of Manitoba MLAs
21st-century Canadian politicians
Year of birth missing (living people)